Todd Townshend (born 1967) is the 14th Bishop of The Diocese of Huron in the Anglican Church of Canada. He was Ordained to the diaconate May 14, 1992, ordained to the priesthood on November 30, 1992, and Consecrated a Bishop and Installed as the 14th Bishop of Huron at St. Paul's Cathedral, London, ON on Saturday January 25, 2020.

Townshend received a BSc from the University of Waterloo in 1989, an MDiv with honours from Huron University College in 1992, and a ThD from the University of Toronto and Wycliffe College in 2007. His dissertation is titled "The Sacramentality of Preaching".  

Townshend has served in several London parishes. Townshend also served as the Dean of the Faculty of Theology at Huron University College between 2013 and 2019. Prior to assuming his role as Dean of the Faculty, Townshend taught at Huron University College since 2002 in a variety of roles including Professor of Homiletics and Pastoral Theology and Associate Professor of Contextual Theology.

Townshend chairs various diocesan committees and has chaired or continues to serve on various national committees of the Anglican Church of Canada.

Personal life 
Townshend's grandfather (William) and father (Robert) also served as bishops in the Diocese of Huron.

Townshend is married to Stacey, and they have three children: Tyne, Seth, and Samuel.

Published works 
Townshend academic work includes the aforementioned book, The Sacramentality of Preaching, as well as contributions to multi-author works:
 
 "What Can Death Teach Us About Preaching?", Liturgy Journal Volume 33, 2018 - Issue 1: Death and the Liturgy.
 "Lectionary Homiletics", Four entries: Advent II to Christmas I, December 2014.

References

Academic staff of the University of Western Ontario
20th-century Canadian Anglican priests
21st-century Anglican Church of Canada bishops
Living people
1967 births